Konstantin Igropulo (born 14 April 1985) is a Russian-Greek former handball player and current assistant coach of FC Barcelona. He played as right back. 

He competed at the 2008 Summer Olympics in Beijing, where the Russian team placed sixth.

References

External links

1985 births
Living people
Sportspeople from Stavropol
Russian people of Greek descent
Russian male handball players
Olympic handball players of Russia
Handball players at the 2008 Summer Olympics
Expatriate handball players in Poland
Russian expatriate sportspeople in Greece
Russian expatriate sportspeople in Spain
Russian expatriate sportspeople in Germany
Russian expatriate sportspeople in Denmark
Russian expatriate sportspeople in France
Russian expatriate sportspeople in Poland
Liga ASOBAL players
FC Barcelona Handbol players
Füchse Berlin Reinickendorf HBC players
Handball-Bundesliga players
KIF Kolding players
Wisła Płock (handball) players